Manju Malhi (born c. 1972) is a British-born chef and food writer, specialising in Anglo-Indian cuisine. She was brought up in North West London where she grew up surrounded by Indian culture, traditions and lifestyles. However, she spent several years of her childhood in India where she explored and experienced the vast and varied cuisines of the country. Malhi has come up with her own self-styled "Brit-Indi" style of food, which mixes Indian and Western influences.

Malhi came to prominence in 1999 when she won a competition to find a guest chef for the BBC's Food and Drink programme and cooked with Antony Worrall Thompson on the show. She was later invited back for a second appearance.

Manju's Simply Indian series was aired on the Taste Network in early 2001, and this was followed by her award-winning debut book Brit Spice, published in 2002 by Penguin Books. She has also made guest appearances on several other programmes, on ITV's This Morning, Channel Five's Open House and The Terry and Gaby Show, Sky One, UKTV Food’s Great Food Live and the BBC's Saturday Kitchen.

In 2004 Malhi published a second book, titled India with Passion, which covers regional Indian home cuisine, and a third, Easy Indian Cookbook, was released in April 2008. She is also currently working on a 40-part series on British food for Indian broadcaster NDTV.

Malhi also writes on Indian food for newspapers and magazines, and has provided voice overs for BBC News 24, BBC World and the BBC Asian Network. While writing and researching for her books, she does live continuity announcing for BBC Two television, and is the voice of the BBC Food channel. She also works with the VSO charity to promote their annual Big Curry Night campaign.

References

External links
 Official website

Year of birth missing (living people)
Living people
People from London
Indian food writers
Indian chefs